Streptomyces inhibens is a bacterium species from the genus of Streptomyces which has been isolated from rhizospheric soil of a wheat plant (Triticum aestivum L.) from the Northeast Agricultural University.

See also 
 List of Streptomyces species

References 

inhibens
Bacteria described in 2019